Men's 10,000m races for blind and visually impaired athletes at the 2004 Summer Paralympics were held in the Athens Olympic Stadium. Events were held in two disability classes, each class running a single race.

T11

The T11 event was won by Henry Wanyoike, representing .

Final Round
19 September 2004, 19:35

T13

The T13 event was won by Maher Bouallegue, representing .

Final Round
20 September 2004, 20:15

References

M